Dobcross is a village in the civil parish of the Saddleworth in the Metropolitan Borough of Oldham, in Greater Manchester, England.

Historically a part of the West Riding of Yorkshire, Dobcross was anciently a chapelry in the Quickmere division of Saddleworth. For centuries, Dobcross was a hamlet, sustained by domestic flannel and woollen cloth production. Many of the original 17th and 18th century barns and weavers' cottages survive today as listed buildings.

Together with neighbouring Delph, Dobcross is, geographically, "considered as the centre of Saddleworth", although is not its largest village centre by some margin. Industrial tycoon Henry Platt was born in Dobcross in 1770. John Schlesinger's 1979 film Yanks was filmed on location in Dobcross, and an annual Yanks festival, coupled with a brass band contest on Whit Friday, each contribute to the village's cultural calendar.

History 

Dobcross is located at an ancient crossing point of the River Tame which was formerly used by trans-Pennine packhorses as they travelled east from Lancashire into Yorkshire. The name means the place where horses cross.

At the crossing point of the River Tame lies the site of Walk Mill, which derives its name from the way the wool was 'walked' or trodden to 'full' the cloth before the introduction of mechanical stocks by which the cloth was beaten with fulling hammers to felt and thicken it. Probably the earliest fulling mill in Saddleworth, Walk Mill would have been a common meeting place for the local clothiers.

Beginning with Richard, the Lawton family ran the mill from at least the late 16th century, if not earlier, and their later wealth in buildings, land and money probably came from the monopoly held by the fulling mill in finishing locally made cloth. The size of the business can be estimated in that, by 1792, Saddleworth saw the production of 36,637 cloth pieces, each priced at £7, giving a total revenue of £256,459. From wool to the innkeeping business, the Lawton family continued to be a prominent family in Dobcross through to the early 19th century.

On the morning of Whit Friday, the traditional Whit Walks, a church procession followed by a service, take place in Saddleworth parish. Saddleworth and District Whit Friday Brass Band contests take place every year on the afternoon and evening of Whit Friday.

The playwright Henry Livings (1929–1998) lived in the village and a Henry Livings Memorial Prize is open to bands who have played on any of the morning's walks.

A public house in the village, The Nudger, was once owned by the Olympic swimming champion Henry Taylor of Oldham. The pub eventually went bust.

Governance
Lying within the ancient county boundaries of Yorkshire since a very early time, during the Middle Ages, Dobcross lay within the Saddleworth chapelry of the ancient parish of Rochdale. Like the other Yorkshire areas of the ancient parish, it was in the wapentake of Agbrigg, with the Lancashire areas of the ancient parish being in Salfordshire.

Dobcross was created an ecclesiastical parish in 1797. It is currently in Saddleworth Deanery, part of the Archdeaconry of Rochdale, in the Anglican Diocese of Manchester.

From 1894 to 1900, Dobcross lay within the Saddleworth Rural District, a local government district in the administrative County of York, West Riding. In 1900, Dobcross was merged into Saddleworth Urban District, where it stayed until 1974. Under the Local Government Act 1972, the Saddleworth Urban District was abolished, and Dobcross has, since 1 April 1974, formed part of the Metropolitan Borough of Oldham, within Greater Manchester.

Since 1997, Dobcross has formed part of the parliamentary constituency of Oldham East and Saddleworth, and is represented in the House of Commons by Debbie Abrahams, a member of the Labour Party. Between 1983 and 1997 it was in the Littleborough and Saddleworth constituency.

Demography

The villages of Dobcross and Uppermill were treated as a single entity by the Office for National Statistics in the 2001 United Kingdom Census. As such, there are no demographic statistics for the village on its own. The statistics given here are for the combined population of Dobcross and Uppermill, which are about half a mile apart.

At the 2001 census, the area had a population of 7,475. Of those over 16 years old, 22.5% were single (never married), 49.6% married, and 7.8% divorced. The 3,225 households in the area included 27.7% one-person, 43.2% married couples living together, 8.1% were co-habiting couples, and 6.9% single parents with their children. Of those aged 16–74, 21.1% had no academic qualifications, significantly below the averages of Oldham (37.7%) and England (28.9%).

At the 2001 UK census, 79.6% of residents in the area reported themselves as being Christian, 0.3% Muslim, 0.3% Hindu, 0.2% Buddhist, and 0.2% Jewish. The census recorded 13.3% as having no religion, 0.2% had an alternative religion and 6.0% did not state their religion.

Transport
Dobcross railway station closed in 1955 when the Delph Donkey passenger train service from Oldham to Delph via Greenfield was withdrawn. The line remained in use for goods traffic until 1963.

The main bus route through the village of Dobcross is the 184, operated by First Greater Manchester. This runs twice an hour to Diggle and Huddersfield, and in the opposite direction to Oldham and Manchester. On the hourly service to and from Huddersfield, it avoids the village by taking a quicker route along Wool Road, lying just to the east of the village. The other services through Dobcross Square are the 353 and 354 which run from Denshaw and Carrcote to Ashton-under-Lyne. These each run every two hours Monday to Saturday, and are run by First. There are no evening or Sunday services through Dobcross Square.

Besides the services through the village proper, First services 82 (Uppermill - Manchester, peak hours only), 350 (Ashton - Oldham, every 30 minutes) and X84 (Carrcote - Manchester, peak hours only) serve Dobcross New Road.

See also

Listed buildings in Saddleworth

References

Notes

Bibliography

Further reading
 Livings, Henry (1975) That the Medals and the Baton Be Put on View: story of a village band, 1875-1975. Newton Abbot: David & Charles (relating to Dobcross Band).

External links 

 Dobcross Diary
 Dobcross Silver Band
 Dobcross Youth Band
 Virtual Saddleworth Dobcross

Geography of the Metropolitan Borough of Oldham
Villages in Greater Manchester
Towns and villages of the Peak District
Saddleworth